Dorcadion sinuatevittatum is a species of beetle in the family Cerambycidae. It was described by Pic in 1937. It is known from Turkey.

References

sinuatevittatum
From Wikipedia, the free encyclopedia
Beetles described in 1937